Stephan Witasek (1870-1915) was an Austrian philosopher noted for his contribution to the development of the Graz School. He is cited as the most talented psychologist of the school and was groomed as Alexius Meinong's successor. Witasek is noted for developing a theory of aesthetics within the Graz School's abstract object theory.

Biography 
Witasek was born on May 17, 1870 in Vienna, Austria to Wenzel Johann Witasek and his wife Emilie nee Egery. His father was a chief railway inspector while his mother, the second wife of Wenzel, was a daughter of a Hungarian civil servant. Witasek was the eldest of their two sons. When his father retired, the family moved to Graz. He obtained a degree in philosophy at the University of Graz after completing his study on complexion theory.

Witasek became a scholar, a career, which Rudolf Ameseder described as a meager life marked by hard work, poverty, and belated recognition. Although, he was known for serving as Meinong's private assistant for a decade on Austria's first psychological laboratory, Witasek would be credited for directing the facility's development only after his death. 

Witasek married Alice Makowiczka in 1903 and they had two children, Alice and Georg. He died in 1915 and this contributed to the disintegration of the Graz School.

Works 
Witasek is considered one of the most important representatives of the psychology of aesthetics alongside Theodor Lipps and Johannes Volkelt. His earliest works involved an investigation of the theoretical foundation for aesthetics. This was based on Gustav Fechner's studies, which challenged the idealistic and value-based approaches in aesthetics that prevailed then. Building on Meinong's work, Witasek developed his own psychological aesthetics, where aesthetic properties are considered ideal and extra-objective. This model links the aesthetic object to the subject's mental state. He also contributed to Meinong's work on complexion theory, particularly in the of systematic knowledge of complexions. His investigation of Christian von Ehrenfels' instances of Gestaltqualitaten detailed how a polyphonic composition constitute the different "voices", which are considered complexions.

One of the notable theories that Witasek pushed forward was his claim that pre-existing sensational elements create psychological products in the form of different perceptual configurations. He explored this idea further in collaboration with the Austrian-Italian psychologist, Vittorio Benussi, and the Austrian philosopher and psychologist, Alois Höfler. They were able to explain the process of generating perceptual configurations from the same sensory elements.

Publications 

 Grundzüge der allgemeinen Ästhetik (1904)
 Grundlinien der Psychologie (1907)
 Psychologisches zur ethischen Erziehung : Vortrag, gehalten in der XII. Versammlung der Österr. Gesellschaft für Kinderforschung in Wien, am. 13. mai 1907 (1907)
 Psychologie der Raumwahrnehmung des Auges (1910)
 Principii di estetica generale (1912)

References 

1870 births
1915 deaths
20th-century Austrian philosophers
20th-century Austrian writers
20th-century essayists
Abstract object theory
Austrian essayists
Continental philosophers
Philosophers of mind
Philosophers of psychology
Philosophy academics
Philosophy writers
Academic staff of the University of Graz
University of Graz alumni